Ghizer District may refer to:
 Ghizer District (1974–2019)
 Ghizer District (2019–)

District name disambiguation pages